Cavell may refer to:

Places
 Cavell, Arkansas, unincorporated community, United States
 Cavell Creek, Alberta, Canada
 Edith Cavell Bridge, Otago, New Zealand
 Mount Edith Cavell, Alberta, Canada

Other
Cavell (name)
Elliston & Cavell, a former department store in Oxford, England

See also
Cavill (disambiguation), a related surname